The Aliens Among Us is a collection of science fiction short stories by James White, published in 1969. It contains:

 "Countercharm" (in the Sector General series)
 "To Kill or Cure"
 "Red Alert"
 "Tableau" (in the Sector General series)
 "The Conspirators"
 "The Scavengers"
 "Occupation: Warrior" (originally intended to be a Sector General story, but was re-written)

1969 short story collections
Short story collections by James White (author)
Ballantine Books books